This is a chronology and timeline of the colonization of North America, with founding dates of selected European settlements. See also European colonization of the Americas.

Before Columbus
 986: Norsemen settle Greenland and Bjarni Herjólfsson sights coast of North America, but doesn't land (see also Norse colonization of the Americas).
 : Norse settle briefly in L'Anse aux Meadows in Newfoundland.
 : Norse colony in Greenland dies out.
 1473: João Vaz Corte-Real perhaps reaches Newfoundland; writes about the "Land of Cod fish" in his journal.  The claims of this discovery remain entirely speculative.

Late fifteenth century
1492: Columbus sets sail aboard the Niña, Pinta, and Santa Maria.
1492: Columbus reaches the Bahamas, Cuba and Hispaniola.
1492: La Navidad is established on the island of Hispaniola; it was destroyed by the following year.
1493: The colony of La Isabela is established on the island of Hispaniola.
1493: Columbus arrives in Puerto Rico
1494: Columbus arrives in Jamaica.
1496: Santo Domingo, the first European permanent settlement, is built.
1497: John Cabot reaches Newfoundland.
1498: In his third voyage, Columbus reaches Trinidad and Tobago.
1498: La Isabela is abandoned by the Spanish.
1499: João Fernandes Lavrador maps Labrador and Newfoundland

Sixteenth century
1501: Corte-Real brothers explore the coast of what is today the Canadian province of Newfoundland and Labrador  
1502: Columbus sails along the mainland coast south of Yucatán, and reaches present-day Honduras, Nicaragua, Costa Rica and Panama
1503: Las Tortugas noted by Columbus in passage through the Western Caribbean present-day Cayman Islands
1508: Ponce de León founds Caparra on San Juan Bautista (now Puerto Rico)
1511: Conquest of Cuba begins
1513: Ponce de León in Florida
1515: Conquest of Cuba completed
1517: Francisco Hernández de Córdoba lands on the Yucatán Peninsula
1519: Founding of Villa Rica de la Vera Cruz (Veracruz)
1519: Founding of Panama City by Pedro Arias Dávila 
1521: Hernán Cortés completes the conquest of the Aztec Empire.
1521: Juan Ponce de León tries and fails to settle in Florida.
1524: Pedro de Alvarado conquers present-day Guatemala and El Salvador.
1524: Giovanni da Verrazzano sails along most of the east coast.
1525: Estêvão Gomes enters Upper New York Bay
1526: Lucas Vázquez de Ayllón briefly establishes the failed settlement of San Miguel de Gualdape in South Carolina, the first site of enslavement of Africans in North America and of the first slave rebellion.
1527: Fishermen are using the harbor at St. John's, Newfoundland and other places on the coast.
1535: Jacques Cartier reaches Quebec.
1536: Cabeza de Vaca reaches Mexico City after wandering through North America.
1538: Failed Huguenot settlement on St. Kitts in the Caribbean (destroyed by the Spanish).
1539: Hernando de Soto explores the interior from Florida to Arkansas.
1540: Coronado travels from Mexico to eastern Kansas.
1540: The Spanish reach the Grand Canyon (the area is ignored for the next 200 years).
1541: Failed French settlement at Charlesbourg-Royal (Quebec City) by Cartier and Roberval.
1542: Juan Rodriguez Cabrillo reaches the California coast.
1559: Failed Spanish settlement at Pensacola, Florida.
1562: Failed Huguenot settlement in South Carolina (Charlesfort-Santa Elena site).
1564: French Huguenots at Jacksonville, Florida (Fort Caroline).
1565: Spanish slaughter French 'heretics' at Fort Caroline.
1565: Spanish found Saint Augustine, Florida. (Mission Nombre de Dios)
1566–1587: Spanish in South Carolina (Charlesfort-Santa Elena site).
1568: Dutch revolt against Spain begins. The economic model developed in the Netherlands would define colonial policies in the next two centuries.
1570: Failed Spanish settlement on Chesapeake Bay (Ajacán Mission).
1576: Martin Frobisher reaches the coast of Labrador and Baffin Island.
1579: Sir Francis Drake claims New Albion.
1583: England formally claims Newfoundland (Humphrey Gilbert).
1585: Roanoke Colony founded by English Roanoke Island, North Carolina, failed in 1587
1598: Failed French settlement on Sable Island off Nova Scotia.
1598: Spanish settlement in Northern New Mexico.
1600: By 1600 Spain and Portugal were still the only significant colonial powers. North of Mexico the only settlements were Saint Augustine and the isolated outpost in northern New Mexico. Exploration of the interior was largely abandoned after the 1540s. Around Newfoundland 500 or more boats annually were fishing for cod and some fishermen were trading for furs, especially at Tadoussac on the Saint Lawrence.

Seventeenth century

 1605 – Port Royal – French
 1607 – Jamestown – English
 1607 – Popham Colony – English
 1608 – Quebec – French
 1610 – Cuper's Cove – English
 1610 – Kecoughtan, Virginia – English
 1610 – Santa Fe – Spanish
 1611 – Henricus – English
 1612 – Bermuda - English
 1615 – Fort Nassau – Dutch
 1615 – Renews, Newfoundland – English
 1618 – Bristol's Hope – English

 1620 – St. John's, Newfoundland – English
 1620 – Plymouth Colony – English
 1621 – Nova Scotia – Scottish
 1622 – Province of Maine – English
 1623 – Portsmouth – English
 1623 – Stage Point  – English
 1623 – Dover  – English
 1623 – Pannaway  – English
 1623 – New Castle  – English
 1623 – Fort Nassau – Dutch
 1624 – St. Kitts – English
 1624 – Governors Island – Dutch
 1625 – Cape Breton –  Scottish
 1625 – New Amsterdam – Dutch
 1626 – Salem – English
 1630 – Massachusetts Bay Colony – English
 1630 – Pavonia – Dutch
 1631 – Saint John, New Brunswick – English
 1632 – Williamsburgh – English
 1633 – Fort Hoop – Dutch
 1633 – Windsor, Connecticut – English
 1634 – Maryland Colony  – English
 1634 – Wethersfield – English
 1635 – Territory of Sagadahock – English
 1635 – Saybrook Colony - English
 1636 – Providence Plantations – English
 1636 – Connecticut Colony – English
 1638 – New Haven Colony – English
 1638 – Fort Christina – Swedish
 1638 – Exeter – English
 1638 – Hampton, New Hampshire - English 
 1639 – Bridgeport, Connecticut – English
 1639 – Newport – English
 1639 – San Marcos – Spanish
 1640 – New Stockholm – Swedish
 1640 – Swedesboro – Swedish
 1642 – Montreal – French
 1651 – Fort Casimir – Dutch
 1652 - York, Maine
 1653 - Biddeford, Maine
 1658 - Scarborough, Maine
 1660 – Bergen – Dutch
 1665 – Elizabethtown – English 
 1666 – Newark – English
 1668 – Sault Ste. Marie (Michigan) - French,
 1669 – English Neighborhood – Dutch, English,
 1670 – Charleston – English
 1678 – New Paltz, New York – French
 1679 – Acquackanonk – Dutch
 1680 – Fort Crevecoeur (Peoria, Illinois) – French
 1682 – Pennsylvania – English
 1683 – Fort Saint Louis (Illinois) – French
 1683 – East New Jersey – Scottish
 1684 – Stuarts Town, Carolina – Scottish
 1685 – Fort Saint Louis (Texas) – French
 1686 – Arkansas Post - French
 1691 – Fort Pimiteoui (Fort Crevecoeur, Peoria, Illinois) – French
 1698 – Pensacola, Florida – Spanish
 1699 – Louisiana – French

Eighteenth century
 1701 – Detroit – French
 1702 – Mobile – French
 1704 – Delaware separated from Pennsylvania
 1706 - Albuquerque - Spanish
 1714 – Natchitoches - French
 1714 – Germanna, Virginia – Germans from Hessen-Nassau
 1717 – Germanna, Virginia – Germans from Baden-Württemberg
 1718 – New Orleans – French
 1718 – San Antonio – Spanish
 1721 – Germanna, Virginia – Germans
 1721 – Greenland – Danish
 1729 – Baltimore – British
 1733 – Province of Georgia – British
 1734 – Culpeper, Virginia – Germans
 1738 – Culpeper, Virginia; some to Bethlehem, Pennsylvania – Germans
 1763 – St. Louis (Missouri) – French
 1769 – San Diego – Spanish
 1770 – Monterey – Spanish
 1775 – Tucson – Spanish
 1776 – San Francisco – Spanish
 1777 – San Jose – Spanish
 1781 – Los Angeles – Spanish
 1784 – Kodiak Island – Russian
 1787 – U.S. constitution written – American
 1791 – Santa Cruz – Spanish

See also

British colonization of the Americas
French colonization of the Americas
Russian colonization of North America
Spanish colonization of the Americas
List of North American settlements by year of foundation
New Netherland settlements
List of French possessions and colonies
Former colonies and territories in Canada
Chronology of Western colonialism
Timeline of European imperialism
European colonization of the Americas
Former colonies and territories in Canada

References

Timelines of North American history
European colonization of North America